Jock McLorinan (31 August 1906 – 11 October 1953) was an  Australian rules footballer who played with St Kilda in the Victorian Football League (VFL).

Notes

External links 

1906 births
1953 deaths
Australian rules footballers from Victoria (Australia)
St Kilda Football Club players